Mehan is a surname. Notable people with the surname include:

Charles Mehan (1896–1972), American rugby union player 
David Mehan, Australian politician
Hande Mehan (born 1995), Turkish musician and songwriter

See also
Mahan (name)